Palythoa is a genus of anthozoans in the order Zoantharia.

Description
The polyps of Palythoa are partially embedded in an encrusting mat of tissue (coenenchyme) covering the substrate on which the colony grows. The individual polyps have flattened oral discs surrounded by a fringe of  tentacles. The tentacles' shape and size can vary considerably between species, and even between colonies of the same species. Their colors are also highly variable, with relatively dull shades like cream, coffee, white, brown, or yellow, being the most common.  Fluorescent colored colonies also exist, but these are more rare.

Palytoxin
Palytoxin is a highly toxic fatty alcohol produced by many species of Palythoa, and is also found in other corals and certain marine invertebrates. The substance was first isolated from the seaweed-like "limu-make-o-Hana" ("Seaweed of Death from Hana") in 1971 in Hawaii. Scientific investigation of the seaweed found it to be a colonial cnidarian, which was classified as a zoanthid and named Palythoa toxica. Small quantities of palytoxin can be fatal should it be ingested or inhaled.

The presence of this toxin is of significance to aquarists who keep reef aquariums, as Palythoa and related zoanthids are commonly kept as decorative specimens in marine aquaria.  Aquarists have reported symptoms consistent with palytoxin poisoning prior to having exposure to zoanthids suspected to contain the toxin.  One report involved an aquarist being accidentally poisoned through skin injuries after handling zoanthids. Another report involved an aquarium hobbyist in Virginia who experienced a severe respiratory reaction after trying to eradicate colonies of brown zoanthids (suspected to be Palythoa) from rocks in their aquarium. A 2010 study found that a single specimen of Palythoa from a sample of fifteen colonies purchased from three aquarium stores in the Washington D.C. area contained high levels of palytoxin, indicating that toxic individuals are present in the captive population.

While poisoning events have occurred, they are exceedingly rare, and many reef hobbyists have kept Palythoa without any adverse reactions. However, it is generally recommended to always wear appropriate protective gloves and goggles when reaching into aquaria and handling animals which are suspected to be toxic.

Taxonomy and systematics
The genus Protopalythoa was once thought to be distinct from the genus Palythoa but is now considered to be a synonym.

Species
The following species are recognized in the genus Palythoa:

 Palythoa aggregata Lesson, 1830
 Palythoa anneae Carlgren, 1938
 Palythoa anthoplax Pax & Müller, 1957¹
 Palythoa arenacea Heller, 1868
 Palythoa argus Ehrenberg, 1834
 Palythoa aspera Pax, 1909
 Palythoa atogrisea Pax, 1924
 Palythoa australiae Carlgren, 1937¹
 Palythoa australiensis Carlgren, 1950
 Palythoa bertholeti Gray, 1867
 Palythoa brasiliensis Heider, 1899
 Palythoa braunsi Pax, 1924
 Palythoa brochi Pax, 1924
 Palythoa buitendijkl Pax, 1924
 Palythoa caesia Dana, 1846
 Palythoa calcaria Muller, 1883
 Palythoa calcigena Pax, 1924
 Palythoa calycina Pax, 1909
 Palythoa canalifera Pax, 1908
 Palythoa canariensis Haddon & Duerden, 1896
 Palythoa cancrisocia Martens, 1876
 Palythoa capensis Haddon & Duerden, 1896¹
 Palythoa caracasiana Pax, 1924
 Palythoa caribaeorum (Duchassaing & Michelotti, 1860)
 Palythoa ceresina Pax & Muller, 1956
 Palythoa chlorostoma Pax & Muller, 1956
 Palythoa cingulata Milne Edwards, 1857
 Palythoa clavata (Duchassaing, 1850)
 Palythoa complanata Carlgren, 1951¹
 Palythoa congoensis Pax, 1952
 Palythoa dartevellei Pax, 1952
 Palythoa densa Carlgren, 1954¹
 Palythoa denudata Dana, 1846
 Palythoa dura Carlgren, 1920
 Palythoa durbanensis Carlgren, 1938¹
 Palythoa dysancrita Pax & Muller, 1956
 Palythoa eremita Pax, 1920
 Palythoa fatua Schultze, 1867
 Palythoa flavoviridis Ehrenberg, 1834
 Palythoa fuliginosa Dana, 1846
 Palythoa fusca (Duerden, 1898)
 Palythoa glareola (Lesueur, 1817)
 Palythoa glutinosa Duchassaing & Michelotti, 1864
 Palythoa grandiflora (Verrill, 1900)
 Palythoa grandis (Verrill, 1900)
 Palythoa gregorii Haddon & Duerden, 1896
 Palythoa gridellii Pax & Muller, 1956
 Palythoa guangdongensis Zunan, 1998¹
 Palythoa guinensis von Koch, 1886¹
 Palythoa haddoni Carlgren, 1937¹
 Palythoa halidosis Pax, 1952
 Palythoa hartmeyeri Pax, 1910
 Palythoa heideri Carlgren, 1954¹
 Palythoa heilprini (Verrill, 1900)
 Palythoa heliodiscus (Ryland & Lancaster, 2003)
 Palythoa horstii Pax, 1924
 Palythoa howesii Haddon & Shackleton, 1891¹
 Palythoa hypopelia Pax, 1909
 Palythoa ignota Carlgren, 1951
 Palythoa incerta Carlgren, 1900
 Palythoa insignis Carlgren, 1951
 Palythoa irregularis Duchassaing & Michelotti, 1860
 Palythoa isolata Verrill, 1907
 Palythoa javanica Pax, 1924
 Palythoa kochii Haddon & Shackleton, 1891
 Palythoa leseuri Klunzinger, 1877
 Palythoa leucochiton Pax & Muller, 1956
 Palythoa liscia Haddon & Duerden, 1896
 Palythoa mammillosa (Ellis & Solander, 1786)
 Palythoa mizigama Irei, Sinniger & Reimer, 2015
 Palythoa monodi Pax & Muller, 1956
 Palythoa multisulcata Carlgren, 1900¹
 Palythoa mutuki (Haddon & Shackleton, 1891)
 Palythoa natalensis Carlgren, 1938
 Palythoa nelliae Pax, 1935
 Palythoa nigricans McMurrich, 1898
 Palythoa oorti Pax, 1924
 Palythoa psammophilia Walsh & Bowers, 1971
 Palythoa senegalensis Pax & Muller, 1956
 Palythoa senegambiensis Carter, 1882
 Palythoa shackletoni Carlgren, 1937
 Palythoa sinensis Zunan, 1998¹
 Palythoa singaporensis Pax & Müller, 1956¹
 Palythoa spongiosa Andres, 1883
 Palythoa stephensoni Carlgren, 1937¹
 Palythoa texaensis Carlgren & Hedgpeth, 1952
 Palythoa titanophila Pax & Müller, 1957¹
 Palythoa toxica Walsh & Bowers, 1971
 Palythoa tropica Carlgren, 1900
 Palythoa tuberculosa (Esper, 1791)
 Palythoa umbrosa Irei, Sinniger & Reimer, 2015
 Palythoa variabilis (Duerden, 1898)
 Palythoa vestitus (Verrill, 1928)
 Palythoa wilsmoorei Wilsmore¹
 Palythoa xishaensis Zunan, 1998¹
 Palythoa yongei Carlgren, 1937¹
 Palythoa zanzibarica Carlgren¹

¹Indicates Species Unreviewed: has not been verified by a taxonomic editor

Taxon inquirendum:
Palythoa anduzii (Duchassaing & Michelotti, 1860)
Palythoa auricula (Lesueur, 1817) 
Palythoa brevis Andres, 1883 
Palythoa casigneta Walsh, 1967
Palythoa distans (Duchassaing & Michelotti, 1866) 
Palythoa dubiae Walsh, 1967 
Palythoa eupaguri Marion, 1882
Palythoa fulva Walsh, 1967
Palythoa fulva (Quoy & Gaimard, 1833)
Palythoa gigantea Cubit & Williams, 1983 
Palythoa glomerata Marion, 1882
Palythoa lutea (Quoy & Gaimard, 1833)
Palythoa mcmurrichi (Haddon & Shackleton, 1891) 
Palythoa olivascens Brandt, 1835 
Palythoa plana (Duchassaing & Michelotti, 1860) 
Palythoa vanikorensis (Quoy & Gaimard, 1833)
Palythoa viridifusca (Quoy & Gaimard, 1833) 
Palythoa viridis (Quoy & Gaimard, 1833)

References

 
Sphenopidae
Hexacorallia genera